Sam Talakai (born 4 September 1991), is an Australian rugby union player of Tongan descent. His usual position is Tighthead prop.

Family and early life
Talakai was born in Sydney. He attended Waverley College where he played rugby for the 1st XV team.

Career
Talakai joined the Sydney University club in 2010, and by 2012 was a regular starter in their first grade Shute Shield team. In 2012 he was selected in the Junior Waratahs side to play in the Pacific Rugby Cup, and in 2013 he made his debut off the bench for the Waratahs against the British and Irish Lions. In 2014 he was recruited by  coach Nick Stiles to play in the National Rugby Championship.

International

On the 26th of November 2022, Talakai was substituted onto the field in place of Allan Alaalatoa in the 71st minute of the Wallabies game against Wales, marking his debut in which the Wallabies won 39 to 34.

Super Rugby statistics

Reference list

External links
Stats on itsrugby.co.uk

1991 births
Australian sportspeople of Tongan descent
Australian rugby union players
Rugby union props
Living people
Rugby union players from Sydney
Queensland Reds players
Brisbane City (rugby union) players
New South Wales Waratahs players
Melbourne Rebels players
Australian expatriate rugby union players
Expatriate rugby union players in Japan
Tokyo Sungoliath players
Australia international rugby union players